The Ogden Nature Center is a  nature preserve and education center located in Ogden, Utah. Created in 1975, it was Utah's first nature center.

About 
The center includes live animal exhibits, walking trails, ponds, bird blinds, observation towers, treehouses, gardens featuring drought resistant plants, and protected areas for wildlife. It offers nature-based classes and activities for children and adults, as well as classes on environmental issues.

In 2003, the center added a  education building, constructed on green building principles and insulated with recycled materials.

In 2018, artist Jane Kim painted three murals at the Ogden Nature Center featuring images of monarch butterflies as part of her Migrating Mural series to bring attention to declining species.

References

External links
 Official site

Nature centers in Utah
Buildings and structures in Ogden, Utah
Protected areas of Weber County, Utah
Education in Weber County, Utah
Tourist attractions in Ogden, Utah
1975 establishments in Utah